Lindsey Brooke Kraft (born January 23, 1983) is an American actress, model and writer. She is best known for playing Marguerite Macaw on Getting On, Leslie Curry on Living Biblically, and Allison on Grace and Frankie.

Kraft has also appeared in films such as Epic Movie (2007), Nostalgia (2018), and A Futile and Stupid Gesture (2018).

Early life
Kraft was born in Manhasset, New York, on January 23, 1983, and grew up on Long Island, New York. She is a graduate of the University of Maryland.

Filmography

Film

Television

References

External links
 

1980 births
Living people
20th-century American actresses
21st-century American actresses
Actresses from New York (state)
American film actresses
American television actresses
People from Manhasset, New York